Adrian Vlăduț Rotaru (born 1 July 1994) is a Romanian handballer who plays as a pivot for CSM București and the Romania national team.

Achievements
Liga Națională:  
Silver Medalist: 2015, 2016, 2017
Cupa României:
Winner: 2016

Individual awards 
World University Handball Championship Top Scorer: 2018

References

1994 births
Living people
People from Onești
Romanian male handball players